Night Screams is a 1987 American horror film directed by Allen Plone.

Plot
Somewhere in Wichita, Kansas, David is a potential college football star who's just won a four-year scholarship to a college somewhere in Oklahoma. His friends decide to throw him a serious farewell party while his parents are out that night, including D.B, Russell, Joni, Lisa, Frannie, Doug, Chris, Brenda, Mason, and Chuck. Unfortunately, three uninvited guests secretly gatecrash these nightly celebrations. Two are convicts named Runner and Snake who've fled from prison, now hiding out in the home's cellar, while the third interloper is a former mental patient with a connection to David himself.

The party goes into peak. Mason, sitting alone in a rocking chair, is impaled with a fireplace poker. Brenda, who feels rejected by Mason, leaves the party. While driving, someone in the back of the car grabs her, & she gets out and hides under a nearby abandoned car. The killer destroys the car lifter, which causes it to crush Brenda to death. Chris and Doug continue to watch pornography. Lisa, Russell, and D.B are drinking while Joni, a new classmate, feels insulted by them and runs upstairs while Lisa confronts Russell about his jokes. Soon after, Chris and Doug find another place to have sex. Joni talks to David about his friends. After making out, Chris goes to swim in the pool. Doug, resting in the sauna room, is killed by a light-bulb cable tossed into the hot stones, releasing poison gas. Soon after, Chris is killed by an axe to the head in the pool.

David is losing his temper, which causes Joni to worry. Frannie and Chuck make out in the Jacuzzi. Chuck goes to the kitchen to cook when the killer forces his face into the grilling pan and stabs his neck. Lisa goes down to the cellar to get more wine when Snake strangles her to death. Runner is upset by all the killings, and Snake suffocates him with cling film. Russell is choked to death with a pool cue, and Frannie is electrocuted in the Jacuzzi. David's parents hurry home to deliver his prescription when a cop pulls them over for speeding. D.B finds the dead bodies of Russell, Runner, and Lisa. As he attempts to search for others, he is stabbed in the gut. Snake attacks David and is about to kill him when the dying D.B. arrives and fatally stabs Snake. David reunites with Joni and learns she is insane and killed the others except for Lisa. Joni then tries to stab David as his parents and the cop arrives and opens fire. It is revealed that David had a hyperactivity disorder since he was a kid that causes him to lose his temper. David is blamed for the murders while a still-insane Joni recovers in the hospital.

Cast

 Joe Manno as David
 Ron Thomas as D.B.
 Randy Lundsford as Russell
 Megan Wyss as Joni
 Janette Allyson Caldwell as Lisa
 John Hines as Snake
 Diana Martin as Frannie
 Jerry Goehring as Doug
 Susan Lyles as Chris
 Barbara Schoenhofer as Brenda
 Dan Schramm as Mason
 Mike Roark as Chuck
 Tony Brown as Runner
 Dennis Arnold as Roger
 Leslie Thomas as Beverly
 William Collier as Jake
 Lucinda Brewer as Lilly
 Troy Mays as Johnny
 Delos V. Smith Jr. as Dr. Tyler

See also
 Horror-of-personality
 Splatter
 Slasher films

References

External links
 

1987 films
1987 horror films
1987 independent films
1980s mystery films
1980s serial killer films
1980s teen horror films
American teen horror films
Cheerleading films
Films set in Kansas
Films shot in Kansas
American independent films
American serial killer films
American slasher films
1980s slasher films
1980s English-language films
1980s American films